Golos Respubliki (Voice of the Republic) was a Kazakhstani newspaper.

It  was founded by Russian journalist Irina Petrushova in 2000. Published weekly, it focused on covering business and economic issues in Kazakhstan, and frequently published stories critical of the regime, including financial mismanagement and supposed cronyism, such as the granting of oil rights to one of President Nazarbayev's relatives, and the disappearance of funds for an airport in Almaty. The paper also claimed that Nazarbayev had sequestered US$1 billion of the state's oil revenues in a Swiss bank account, although the government stated that this had been an emergency fund used to rescue the national economy in 1998.

Extremism charges in court
In November 2012, the newspaper was taken to court along with some 40 other media organizations for alleged violation of "Kazakhstan's laws on extremism and national security", but contrary to expectations, Golos was not vindicated and the newspaper had to suspend its operations.

References

See also
Media of Kazakhstan

Russian-language newspapers published in Kazakhstan